Plenary is an adjective related to the noun plenum carrying a general connotation of fullness. 

Plenary may also refer to:

Plenary session or meeting, the part of a conference when all members of all parties are in attendance
Plenary speaker, a speaker at a plenary session; distinguish from a sectional speaker
Plenary power or plenary authority, the complete power of a governing body
Plenary council, one of various councils of the Catholic Church
Plenary indulgence, a type of religious indulgence
Plenary Group, an Australian company